Leap is a 2020 biographical sports film directed by Peter Chan and starring Gong Li and Huang Bo. The film is based on the China women's national volleyball team's stories spread over more than 40 years. The film was released in Mainland China and the United States on September 25, 2020. It had been slated for release in China on January 25, 2020, the first day of the Chinese New Year, but was withdrawn due to the COVID-19 pandemic.

The film's Chinese title was originally named "China Women's Volleyball Team" ("Zhong Guo Nu Pai") but due to regulatory issues, was renamed as Duoguan ("to take the crown") one day before pre-release sales started. Leap is the Chinese entry for the Best International Feature Film at the 93rd Academy Awards, but it was not nominated.

Cast

 Gong Li as Coach Lang Ping
 Lydia Bai as Young Lang Ping
 Huang Bo as Chen ZhongHe
 Peng YuChang as Young Chen ZhongHe
 Wu Gang as Yuan Weimin

Lang Ping the player is played by her real-life daughter Lydia Bai (Chinese name: Bai Lang), a former Stanford Cardinal player. Lydia Bai herself is played by Audrey Hui (Joan Chen's daughter) in the film.

2013–16 Chinese national team

 Zhu Ting as herself 
 Xu Yunli as herself
 Hui Ruoqi as herself
 Yuan Xinyue as herself
 Yan Ni as herself
 Gong Xiangyu as herself
 Ding Xia as herself
 Lin Li as herself
 Zhang Changning as herself
 Liu Xiaotong as herself
 Yao Di as Wei Qiuyue
 Zeng Chunlei
 Liu Yanhan
 Zheng Yixin 
 Wang Mengjie
 Wang Yuanyuan
 Yang Hanyu
 Wang Lujia as the player who quit

The cast consists of ten out of the twelve Olympic Gold medalists from the 2016 Rio Olympics squad appearing as themselves. As Wei Qiuyue was pregnant at the time of filming, Yao Di (who was cut before the Olympics) was cast to act as Wei. (Despite Wei's absence, her husband Yuan Lingxi, who has been an assistant coach on the team, appears in the film as himself.)

1980s Chinese national team

Lydia Bai as Lang Ping 
 Li Dongxu as Chen Zhaodi
 Liu Mintao as Old Chen Zhaodi
Chen Zhan as Sun Jinfang
 Luo Hui as Zhou Xiaolan
 Ling Min as Zhou Lumin
 Ma Xuechun as Zhang Rongfang
 Liu Chang as Yang Xi 
 Liu Chenxi as Zhang Jieyun
 Li Ziwei as Chen Yaqiong
 Mao Wen as Cao Huiying
 Liu Zhenhong as Liang Yan
 Li Yangyi as Zhu Ling

Others

Kaori Kodaira as Miyoko Hirose
Hitomi Nakamichi
Logan Tom as herself
Halle Johnson as Flo Hyman
Jarasporn Bundasak
Sutadta Chuewulim
Anongporn Promrat
Tapaphaipun Chaisri
Jaqueline Carvalho as herself
Marianne Steinbrecher
Juliana Nogueira
Paula Pequeno
Bárbara Kozonoe
Alexandre Rivetti de Azevedo as José Roberto Guimarães
Liu Tao as Feng Kun
Zhao Chenlu as Wang Yimei
Li Shan as Lai Yawen
Li Xian (special appearance)
Zhang Hanyan as Lang Ping's mother
Audrey Hui as Lang Ping's daughter

Production

Hong Kong American director Peter Chan was signed to direct the film. Gong Li plays the female lead, Lang Ping, the current head coach of the China women's national volleyball team. Filming began on April 16, 2019 and wrapped up in August 2019.

Soundtrack
The theme song "River of Life" (生命之河) is a duet by Faye Wong and Na Ying, and produced by Zhang Yadong.

The promotion song "Day and Night" (不分昼夜) is sang by Jackson Yee, and produced by Radio Mars

Instrumental music

Release
Leap was scheduled for release on January 25, 2020, in China, but was withdrawn due to COVID-19 pandemic. The film debuted in China on September 25, 2020, a few days before the National Day of the People's Republic of China. That weekend, theaters were allowed to sell up to 75% of available tickets, compared to 50%, due to a loosening of COVID-19 restrictions. It made its United States debut on the same day across 80 theaters in select cities.

Reception 
On its first day at the Chinese box office, the film earned $8.2 million. It went on to earn 700 million yuan (approximately $104 million) through the Golden Week holiday.

Awards and nominations

See also
 List of submissions to the 93rd Academy Awards for Best International Feature Film
 List of Chinese submissions for the Academy Award for Best International Feature Film
 Chak De! India

References

External links
 
 
 
 
 

2020 films
2020 biographical drama films
2020s Mandarin-language films
2020s sports drama films
Biographical films about sportspeople
Chinese biographical drama films
Chinese sports drama films
Films about the 2008 Summer Olympics
Films postponed due to the COVID-19 pandemic
Films scored by Shigeru Umebayashi
Films set in 1981
Films set in 2008
Films set in 2013
Films set in 2016
Films set in Beijing
Films set in Osaka
Films set in Rio de Janeiro (city)
Films shot in Beijing
Volleyball films